Warlingham Park Hospital was a psychiatric hospital in Warlingham, Surrey.

History
The facility, which was designed by George Oatley and Willie Swinton Skinner, was built at a cost of £200,000 and opened as the Croydon Mental Hospital on 26 June 1903. This was reputedly the first institution to be called a 'mental hospital' and never appears officially to have been called an asylum. The hospital was extended in the early 20th century with the addition of a nurses' home, two further blocks for female patients and four villas.

The hospital became Chelsham Mental Hospital in 1923. It was a pioneering centre for psychosurgery. Surgeon John Crumbie designed his own leucotome (instrument for cutting the white matter in the brain) which was constructed by Warlingham's assistant clerk of works, and referred to by Wylie McKissock, who operated with a Cushing brain needle, as a "mechanical egg-whisk". If the patients resisted the surgery they were given electroconvulsive shocks before being anaesthetised. It also had a specialist Regional unit to treat patients suffering from alcohol dependency, Pinel House.

The facility went on to become Warlingham Park Hospital in 1937 and joined the National Health Service in 1948. After the introduction of Care in the Community in 1983, the hospital went into a period of decline and eventually closed in 1999.

The archives were deposited with the Bethlem Royal Hospital which subsequently became the primary provider of mental health care to residents of Croydon. Although the Grade II listed water tower was retained, the remainder of the buildings were demolished to make way for an up-market housing estate known as Greatpark.

See also
 Healthcare in London

References

Hospital buildings completed in 1903
Hospitals in Surrey
Defunct hospitals in England
Former psychiatric hospitals in England
Hospitals established in 1903
Health in the London Borough of Croydon
Tandridge
1903 establishments in England
Hospitals disestablished in 1999